Reinhold Frank (23 July 1896 – 23 January 1945) was a German lawyer. He did work for the resistance to Hitler's rule in Nazi Germany. He was sentenced to death in connection with the failed 20 July Plot.

Life
Reinhold Frank was born the youngest of seven children in Bachhaupten in the Sigmaringen district. After serving in the military in the First World War, he studied law in Freiburg. He was a member of the Katholische Deutsche Studentenverbindung Arminia ("Catholic German Studentenverbindung Arminia") in the Cartellverband der katholischen deutschen Studentenverbindungen. After his time as a junior lawyer, he went to Karlsruhe and there, together with Dr. Honold, he ran a law practice. Owing to his Christian outlook, Nazi ideology did not sit well with Frank. He often found himself defending persecuted clients of all political and religious stripes, among them Catholic priests, who often ended up before the courts during the time of the Third Reich for having uttered criticisms of the régime.

Reinhold Frank belonged to the circle about the resistance group founded by Dr. Carl Friedrich Goerdeler. He had already agreed to stand ready in Baden to take a leading role in Germany's reconstruction, should the plot to overthrow Hitler actually succeed. It was therefore no wonder that, after the attempt on Hitler's life at the Wolf's Lair in East Prussia failed, Frank was arrested quite quickly, on 21 July 1944, the day after the attempt. Frank was found guilty by the Volksgerichtshof of high treason and treason. On 12 January 1945, he was sentenced to death. He was hanged on 23 January at Plötzensee Prison in Berlin.

In his honour, a memorial stone has been placed at the Hauptfriedhof ("Main Cemetery") in Karlsruhe. The street in Karlsruhe where the lawyers' chambers may be found bears his name. The Research Centre for German Resistance against National Socialism in Southwestern Germany, together with the University of Karlsruhe, the City of Karlsruhe, and the German Bundesarchiv, honours Frank yearly in the time around 20 July with a memorial reading.

See also
 List of members of the 20 July Plot

Sources
 Horst Rehberger Reinhold Frank. Rechtsanwalt in Karlsruhe, in: Der Widerstand im deutschen Südwesten 1933-1945. pub. by Michael Bosch und Wolfgang Niess, Stuttgart, 1984
 Michael Kißener, Der Widerstandskreis um den Karlsruher Rechtsanwalt Reinhold Frank, Speech on the occasion of the scientific symposium in the framework of the. European Culture Days, Karlsruhe 1994
 Reinhold Frank zum fünfzigsten Todestag, pub. by the City of Karlsruhe/Stadtarchiv, Karlsruhe 1995
 Uwe Schellinger, Dr. Reinhold Frank (1896-1945), Witnesses for Christ, Twentieth Century German Martyrology, pub. by H. Moll i.A. der Deutschen Bischofskonferenz, Paderborn u.a. 1999, 226
 Detlev Fischer: Anwälte im Widerstand gegen das NS-Regime, RuP 2002, 181

1896 births
1945 deaths
20th-century German lawyers
Executed members of the 20 July plot
People from Baden-Württemberg executed at Plötzensee Prison
Jurists from Baden-Württemberg
People executed by hanging at Plötzensee Prison
People from Sigmaringen (district)